John "Fenners" Fendley is a British television presenter, currently co-host of Sky Sports' Soccer AM.

Career
Between 1997 and 2007, Fendley was a producer on Soccer AM. Upon leaving the show, Fendley began working for internet television channel ChannelBee in 2008.

In August 2015, Fendley was named as a co-presenter of Soccer AM alongside Helen Chamberlain, replacing Max Rushden. As of June 2020, Fendley presents the programme alongside Jimmy Bullard.

He is an occasional 'feature reporter' on Sky Sports News show Soccer Saturday. From 2010–2012, Fendley presented Take It Like a Fan alongside Charlotte Jackson and then Bianca Westwood.

Fendley also co-presented The Fantasy Football Club alongside Paul Merson.

Personal life
Fendley attended East Ayton Primary School and Raincliffe School in Scarborough. After leaving Scarborough Sixth Form College, Fendley had a gap year in Australia.

References

External links

British television presenters
Living people
People from Scarborough, North Yorkshire
1967 births
Soccer AM
Television personalities from Yorkshire